Deva Sundari is a 1957 Indian Malayalam-language film, directed by M. K. R. Nambiar and produced by H. M. Munnas. The film stars Sathyan and Ragini. The film had musical score by T. R. Pappa.

Cast
 Sathyan
 Prem Nazir
 Jose Prakash 
 T. S. Muthaiah
 Adoor Pankajam
 G. K. Pillai
 Kumari Thankam
S. P. Pillai 
 Johnson
 Vijayan (Old)

Music
"Jayajaya Suranayaka" - P. Leela
"Sree Padmanaava" - A. P. Komala
"Pachasumarasara" - Kameswara Rao

References

1957 films
1950s Malayalam-language films
Films scored by T. R. Pappa